A Soldier's Play is a play by American playwright Charles Fuller. Set on a US Army installation in the segregation-era South, the play is a loose adaptation of Herman Melville's novella Billy Budd, and follows the murder investigation of the Sergeant in an all-black unit. The play uses a murder mystery to explore the complicated feelings of anger and resentment that some African Americans have toward one another, and the ways in which many black Americans have absorbed white racist attitudes. 

The drama won the 1982 Pulitzer Prize for Drama, among other accolades. It was the basis for a 1984 feature film adaptation, A Soldier's Story, for which Fuller wrote the screenplay.

Plot synopsis
The story takes place at the United States Army's Fort Neal, Louisiana, in 1944 during the time when the military was racially segregated. In the opening scene, the audience witnesses the murder of black Sergeant Vernon Waters by an unseen shooter. Just before his death, Waters utters the enigmatic cry, "They still hate you!"

Captain Richard Davenport, a rare black Army officer, has been sent to investigate the killing. Initially, the primary suspects are local Ku Klux Klansmen. Later, bigoted white soldiers fall under suspicion. Ultimately, Davenport discovers the killer was one of the black soldiers under Waters' command. Waters' men hated him because Waters himself treated Southern black men in utter disdain and contempt.

As Davenport interviews witnesses and suspects, we see flashbacks showing what Sergeant Waters was like, and how he treated his men. The light-skinned Waters was highly intelligent and extremely ambitious, and loathed black men who conformed to old-fashioned racist stereotypes. Waters dreamed of sending his own children to an elite college where they would associate with white students, rather than with other blacks. In Waters' mind, Uncle Toms and "lazy, shiftless Negroes" reflected poorly on him, and made it harder for other African-Americans to succeed. For that reason, Waters persecuted black soldiers like Private C.J. Memphis, whose broad grin and jive talk made Waters' blood boil. Waters' cruelty and vindictiveness drove Memphis to suicide, which alienated the rest of Waters' men, and turned them hopelessly against him.

Shortly before he was murdered, Waters came to realize how futile and foolish his lifelong attempts to behave like a white man had been. His dying words, "They still hate you," reflected his belated understanding that white hatred and disdain of black men like himself had nothing to do with stereotypical black behavior, and that whites would probably always hate him, no matter how hard he tried to emulate "white" ways.

Productions
The play originally was staged Off-Broadway by the Negro Ensemble Company at the Theater Four (now called the Julia Miles Theater). It opened on November 20, 1981, and closed on January 2, 1983, after 468 performances. The original cast included Adolph Caesar as Sergeant Waters, Denzel Washington as Private Peterson, Larry Riley as Private C.J. Memphis, Samuel L. Jackson as Private Louis Henson, Peter Friedman as Captain Charles Taylor, and Charles Brown as Captain Davenport. The director was Douglas Turner Ward. The play won, in addition to the Pulitzer Prize, the Outer Critics Circle Award for Best Off-Broadway Play, the New York Drama Critics' Circle Award for Best American Play, and the Obie Award for Distinguished Ensemble Performance.

The Valiant Theatre Company presented the play Off-Broadway at Theatre Four from November 19, 1996, to December 8. Directed by Clinton Turner Davis, the cast featured Wood Harris (Private First Class Melvin Peterson), Keith Randolph Smith, Danny Johnson (C.J. Memphis), Geoffrey C. Ewing (Captain Richard Davidson), Jonathan Walker and Albert Hall (Sergeant Waters).

The play was revived Off-Broadway by Second Stage Theatre from September 20, 2005 (previews), opening on October 17, 2005, and closing on November 27, 2005. Directed by Jo Bonney, the cast featured James McDaniel as Tech. Sergeant Vernon C. Waters, Anthony Mackie as Private First Class Melvin Peterson, Mike Colter as Private C.J. Memphis, Dorian Missick as  Private Louis Henson, Steven Pasquale as Captain Charles Taylor, and Taye Diggs as Captain Richard Davenport.

Roundabout Theater Company presented the play's Broadway debut in January 2020, starring David Alan Grier as Waters and Blair Underwood as Davenport, directed by Kenny Leon.  It had given 55 performances as of March 8, 2020. On March 11, Broadway theaters were closed due to the COVID-19 pandemic, and performances of the play were suspended.  The revival did not reopen on Broadway post pandemic, but instead went on a national tour for the 2022-2023 season.

Film adaptation

Caesar, Washington and Larry Riley reprised their roles in the film version, A Soldier's Story, directed by Norman Jewison.

Television adaptation 
In September 2021, it was reported that Sony Pictures Television will be adapting the play into a limited television series titled A Soldier's Story. Grier will reprise his role as Waters and also serve as executive producer on the series.

Awards and nominations

Original Off-Broadway Production (1981)

Off-Broadway Revival (2005)

Broadway Revival (2020)

References

External links
 

1981 plays
Off-Broadway plays
Pulitzer Prize for Drama-winning works
New York Drama Critics' Circle Award winners
African-American plays
American plays adapted into films
Plays set in Louisiana
Fiction set in 1944
Tony Award-winning plays